Stelis megachlamys is a species of orchid plant native to Guatemala, Belize, Costa Rica, Panama, and Mexico.

References 

megachlamys
Orchids of Central America
Orchids of Belize
Flora of Guatemala
Flora of Belize
Flora of Costa Rica
Flora of El Salvador
Flora of Honduras
Flora of Mexico
Flora of Panama